Khoros may refer to:

 Khoros (city), better known as Cyrrhus, an ancient city in Syria
 Khoros (dance), one of Greek dances
 Khoros, LLC, American software company

See also
 Koros (disambiguation)
 Choros (disambiguation)